Triple is a 2009 South Korean television series starring Lee Jung-jae, Lee Sun-kyun, Yoon Kye-sang, Lee Ha-na, and Min Hyo-rin. It aired on MBC from June 11 to July 30, 2009 on Wednesdays and Thursdays at 21:55 for 16 episodes.

Plot
Eighteen-year-old aspiring figure skater Lee Ha-ru (Min Hyo-rin) moves to Seoul to pursue her ice dreams. In the city she reunites with her stepbrother Shin Hwal (Lee Jung-jae), whom she hasn't seen in years. Her divorcee mother had remarried Hwal's father when Ha-ru was 6, but their parents died in a car accident when she was 13. Ha-ru was sent to live with her real father (Choi Baek-ho) in the countryside and had since lost touch with Hwal.

Hwal, now in his mid-thirties, works at an advertising agency with his two best friends and roommates, Kang Hyun-tae (Yoon Kye-sang) and Jo Hae-yoon (Lee Sun-kyun). When Ha-ru suddenly shows up at the doorstep of their bachelor pad, she ends up moving in with the three men.

Ha-ru's new figure skating coach, Choi Soo-in (Lee Ha-na) turns out to be Hwal's estranged wife. Her plans to make amends with her ex-husband are derailed when his outgoing friend Hyun-tae falls for her instantly and begins pursuing her.

Hae-yoon and bartender Kang Sang-hee (Kim Hee) are longtime friends. When a one-night stand leads to something more, the more old-fashioned Hae-yoon has difficulty dealing with Sang-hee's commitment issues.

Meanwhile, Ha-ru feels torn between Ji Poong-ho (Song Joong-ki), a short track speed skating national athlete her own age, and her growing romantic feelings for her much older stepbrother Hwal.

Cast
Lee Jung-jae as Shin Hwal
Lee Sun-kyun as Jo Hae-yoon
Yoon Kye-sang as Kang Hyun-tae
Lee Ha-na as Choi Soo-in
Min Hyo-rin as Lee Ha-ru
Kim Hee as Kang Sang-hee
Choi Baek-ho as Haru's father
Song Joong-ki as Ji Poong-ho
Kim Sang-ho as Coach Nam
Choi Sun-young as Yoon Hye-jin
Kim Hye-jung as Soo-in's mother
Jung Ji-soon as U Communications department head Han
Kim Young-kwang as Jae-wook
Jung Byung-chul as company executive
Ryu Sung-hoon as gangster
Kwon Beom-jin as young Jo Hae-yoon
Lee Sung-min as Director Jung
Kang Ji-hoo
Kim Bo-ri 
Kim Byung-choon
Park So-hyun as Coach Shin (cameo)
Kim Chang-wan as Kim Bok-man (cameo)

International broadcast
 It aired in Vietnam on HTV7 in March 2010.

References

External links
Triple official MBC website 
Triple at MBC Global Media

2009 South Korean television series debuts
2009 South Korean television series endings
MBC TV television dramas
South Korean romance television series